, also known by the short title , is a Japanese manga series written and illustrated by Azure Konno, about a girl working as a voice actress for an eroge development company. It was serialized in Wani Books' monthly Comic Gum magazine from 2008 to 2013. A two-episode anime adaptation was produced by Studio Gokumi and released in 2010 and 2011. A sequel manga series titled Koe de Oshigoto!! began serialization in Futabasha's Monthly Action magazine in May 2020.

Plot

Koe de Oshigoto! is a story about Kanna Aoyagi, a sixteen-year-old girl who was asked to become a voice actress for eroge by her older sister on Kanna's sixteenth birthday. Kanna does not want to become a voice actress at first, but after she thinks about all of the things her sister did for her when she was growing up, and knowing that she owes her, she finally agrees.

However, Kanna is still very nervous about being a voice actress for such games. As the story progresses, she becomes more and more comfortable with the requirements of the job. She is helped along by both her coworkers and a classmate who also does work on eroge in his spare time.

Characters

 (OVA), Miku Nishino (Drama CD)
A first year student of Takashima Minami High School. On her 16th birthday, Kanna was asked by her sister, Yayoi, to come to her workplace after school. Once she arrived, Kanna found out that it's an eroge company and was asked to be a voice actress for a game they are developing. She is good with sports and a person great of imagination and concentration to the point where she can have an orgasm with only her imagination. Kanna's work job is kept secret under the pseudonym Aoi Kanna.

 (OVA), Hyosei (Drama CD)
Kanna's 28-year-old elder sister and a "EROGEMEKA" for the eroge company, Blue March. Yayoi cares greatly and always buys presents for Kanna on her birthday. She speaks very bluntly and is not at all embarrassed by her work on eroge.

 (OVA), Kizuna Aihara (Drama CD)
A college student and professional eroge voice actress. Kanna looks up to her as a voice acting role model, and Fumika seem to be the only one who sympathizes with Kanna's embarrassment as a voice actress for eroge. Although she is a professional as an eroge voice actress, Fumika has no experience in real life.

 (OVA), Wasshoi Taro (Drama CD)
The scenario writer for the eroge company, Blue March. He is an older acquaintance of Yayoi and Kanna. He started as someone who loved to read, but after reading some eroge scripts, he began writing them himself. Kanna really respects Nagatoshi and treats him as an older brother.

 
Kanna's twintailed best friend. She talks in a soft spoken tone.

Kanna's other friend from school. She has wavy blonde hair.
 

Kanna's male classmate and her main love interest.

Media

Manga
The manga series Koe de Oshigoto! was written and illustrated by Azure Konno and published by Wani Books. The series was serialized in the Comic Gum magazine, starting in the July 2008 issue, released on May 26, 2008, and ending in the June 2013 issue on April 26, 2013. Wani Books have published it in ten compiled volumes under the imprint Gum Comics Plus between December 23, 2008 and July 25, 2013. The manga is licensed digitally in English by Manga Planet.

A sequel manga titled Koe de Oshigoto!! began serialization in Futabasha's Monthly Action magazine on May 24, 2020. Two compiled volumes were released as of June 2021. The manga will end serialization on November 24, 2021.

Anime
A two-episode anime adaptation titled  was produced by Studio Gokumi. It was directed by Naoto Hosoda, with scripts by Masashi Suzuki and character design by Satoru Kiyomaru. The two episodes were released on Blu-ray Disc and DVD, with the first on November 17, 2010, and the second episode on May 11, 2011, after being postponed twice. The anime has been licensed by Media Blasters, who plan to release it on home video with English subtitles.

See also
 Nobunaga Teacher's Young Bride – Another manga series by the same author

References

External links
 

2008 manga
2010 anime OVAs
Comedy anime and manga
Futabasha manga
Media Blasters
OVAs based on manga
Romance anime and manga
Seinen manga
Studio Gokumi
Wani Books manga